Bonners Ferry Herald (also known as Kootenai Herald) is a U.S. weekly newspaper based out of Bonners Ferry, Idaho. It is owned by the Hagadone Media Group and part of the North Idaho Hagadone News Network. The Kootenai Herald was founded in 1891. Edited and published by Stephen D. Taylor, the Herald was headquartered in the town of Kootenai on the north shore of Lake Pend Oreille for its first six months of publication. In 1892, The Herald moved north to the town of Bonners Ferry along the banks of the Kootenay River. The weekly eight-page, five-column paper was published on Saturdays and covered news from the communities of Sandpoint, Eaton, Eatonville, Fry, Bonners Ferry, and Hope.

The Herald covered the development and construction of the Great Northern Railway through Idaho's panhandle, as well as the Coeur d'Alene mining wars. The paper also chronicled anti-Chinese sentiment in Idaho and the U.S., including the Chinese Exclusion Act and the forced expulsion of Chinese workers from Bonners Ferry in 1892. In the 20th century, the farming and lumber industries sustained the community. The Kootenai Herald published in Bonners Ferry until
1904, when the editor changed the newspaper's name to the Bonners Ferry Herald. The paper's original editor, Stephen D. Taylor, edited the Herald until 1911 when Bert Hall took over as editor for a short time.

In 1912 Charles W. King became the Herald's editor. King sold the Herald in the 1950s. Information courtesy of the Idaho State Historical Society. The Bonners Ferry Herald continues to publish to this day, and its target market primarily includes Boundary County.

References

External links 
 
 The Hagadone Corporation
 The Hagadone Media Group

Newspapers published in Idaho
Bonners Ferry, Idaho
Weekly newspapers published in the United States
1891 establishments in Idaho